Lesing-Gelimi, or Lesing-Atui, is an Austronesian language of New Britain, Papua New Guinea.

References

Arawe languages
Languages of East New Britain Province
Languages of West New Britain Province